Stone Church may refer to:

Settlements in the United States
 Stone Church, Illinois
 Stone Church, New Jersey

Buildings in the United States
Casa Grande Stone Church, Casa Grande, Arizona, listed on the National Register of Historic Places (NRHP)
Stone Church (Ringgold, Georgia), listed on the National Register of Historic Places in Catoosa County
Stone Church (Independence, Missouri), of the Community of Christ
The Stone Church, a live-music venue in Newmarket, New Hampshire
Holland Patent Stone Churches Historic District, Holland Patent, New York, listed on the NRHP
Casstown Lutheran Stone Church, Casstown, Ohio, listed on the NRHP
Zion Stone Church, Augustaville, Pennsylvania, listed on the NRHP
Augusta Stone Church, Fort Defiance, Virginia, listed on the NRHP

See also 
Old Stone Church (disambiguation)